Lisa Flanagan is an Aboriginal Australian actress, known for her roles on stage and in television and film. Film roles include her debut movie Australian Rules and Look Both Ways, while on stage she performed in Wesley Enoch's The Sapphires and The 7 Stages of Grieving several times, and on television in the series  Double Trouble, Redfern Now and Total Control.

Stage
Flanagan's stage roles include:
 The Sapphires (2003/4)
 Parramatta Girls (Belvoir St Theatre, 2007)
 The Eyes of Marege (2007)
 The 7 Stages of Grieving (2008, 2010)
 Brothers Wreck, 2014, 2018

Film

Television

References

External links 
 

Living people
21st-century Australian actresses
Australian film actresses
Australian television actresses
Indigenous Australian actresses
Year of birth missing (living people)